The 1998 NCAA Division II football season, part of college football in the United States organized by the National Collegiate Athletic Association at the Division II level, began on September 5, 1998, and concluded with the NCAA Division II Football Championship on December 12, 1998, at Braly Municipal Stadium in Florence, Alabama, hosted by the University of North Alabama. The Northwest Missouri State Bearcats defeated the Carson–Newman, 24–6, to win their first Division II national title.

The Harlon Hill Trophy was awarded to Brian Shay, running back from Emporia State.

Conference changes and new programs

Program changes
Mankato State University changed its name to Minnesota State University, Mankato in 1998, the Mankato State Mavericks became the Minnesota State Mavericks during the 1998 season.

Conference standings

Conference summaries

Postseason

The 1998 NCAA Division II Football Championship playoffs were the 25th single-elimination tournament to determine the national champion of men's NCAA Division II college football. The championship game was held at Braly Municipal Stadium in Florence, Alabama, for the 12th time.

Playoff bracket

See also
 1998 NCAA Division I-A football season
 1998 NCAA Division I-AA football season
 1998 NCAA Division III football season
 1998 NAIA football season

References